Imam Khomeini Space Launch Terminal (Persian:) is an Iranian space vehicle launch facility, consisting of the service tower and launch pad used to launch the Simorgh launch vehicle. it is a part of the Semnan Space Center located south-east of the provincial capital of Semnan in Semnan Province.

Launch history

See also
Iranian Space Agency
Semnan Space Center
Simorgh (rocket)

References

External links
Videos
Iman Khomeini Space Launch Center Nuclear Threat Initiative (2017)

Rocket launch sites
Space program of Iran
2017 establishments in Iran